The least sandpiper (Calidris minutilla) is the smallest shorebird. The genus name is from Ancient Greek kalidris or skalidris, a term used by Aristotle for some grey-colored waterside birds. The specific minutilla is Medieval Latin for "very small".

Description

This species has greenish legs and a short, thin, dark bill. Breeding adults are brown with dark brown streaks on top and white underneath. They have a light line above the eye and a dark crown. In winter, Least sandpipers are grey above. The juveniles are brightly patterned above with rufous coloration and white mantle stripes.

This bird can be difficult to distinguish from other similar tiny shorebirds; these are known collectively as "peeps" or "stints". In particular, least sandpiper is very similar to its Asian counterpart, long-toed stint. It differs from that species in its more compact, shorter-necked appearance, shorter toes, somewhat duller colors, and stronger wingbar.

Measurements:

 Length: 5.1-5.9 in (13-15 cm)
 Weight: 0.7-1.1 oz (19-30 g)
 Wingspan: 10.6-11.0 in (27-28 cm)

Breeding and migration
Their breeding habitat is the northern North American continent on tundra or in bogs. They nest on the ground near water. The female lays four eggs in a shallow scrape lined with grass and moss. Both parents incubate; the female leaves before the young birds fledge and sometimes before the eggs hatch. The young birds feed themselves and are able to fly within two weeks of birth.

They migrate in flocks to the southern United States, Mexico, Central America, the Caribbean, and northern South America. They occur as very rare vagrants in western Europe.

Feeding
These birds forage on mudflats, picking up food by sight, sometimes by probing. They mainly eat small crustaceans, insects, and snails.

References

Further reading

Identification
 Jonsson, Lars & Peter J. Grant (1984) Identification of stints and peeps British Birds 77(7):293-315

External links

 An online identification article covering this species and other small calidrids at surfbirds.com
 Least sandpiper species account - Cornell Lab of Ornithology
 Least sandpiper - Calidris minutilla - USGS Patuxent Bird Identification InfoCenter
 Least sandpiper photos at Oiseaux.net
 
 
 

Erolia
least sandpiper
Birds of North America
Birds of Central America
Birds of the Caribbean
Birds of Hispaniola
Birds of the Dominican Republic
Birds of South America
Birds of Canada
Birds of Mexico
Birds of the United States
Native birds of Alaska
Least concern biota of North America
Least concern biota of Mexico
Least concern biota of the United States
Least concern biota of South America
least sandpiper
least sandpiper